A beacon is an intentionally conspicuous device designed to attract attention to a specific location.

Beacon may also refer to:

Arts, entertainment and media

Music
 Beacon (band), an American electronic music group
 Beacon (Two Door Cinema Club album), 2012
 Beacon (Susumu Hirasawa album), 2021
 Beacons (album), by Ohbijou, 2009
 Beacons (EP), by I Like Trains, 2012
 Beacons (festival), a British music festival

Other uses in arts, entertainment and media
 Beacon (character), the name of two fictional characters 
 Beacon (Scheer), an art installation in New York, U.S.
 Beacon, a magazine published on the Isle of Wight by Total Sense Media

Businesses and organisations

Companies
 Beacon, a retail fuel brand of Valero Energy
 Beacon Communications (publisher), a publisher of weekly newspapers in Rhode Island, U.S.
 Beacon Communications Corporation, a defunct newspaper publisher in Massachusetts, U.S.
 Beacon Pictures an American film production company, also known as "Beacon Communications, LLC"
 Beacon Press, an American publisher
 Beacon UK, a private provider of mental health services in England
 Beacon Health Options a behavioral health company based in Boston,  Massachusetts

Schools  
 Beacon Status, a school designation in England
 Beacon high schools in Beijing, a school designation in China
 Beacon School (Stamford, Connecticut), U.S.
 Beacon English School, Korba, Chhattisgarh, India
 New Beacon School, formerly The Beacon, Sevenoaks, Kent, England
 The Beacon School, Manhattan, New York, U.S.
 The Beacon School, Banstead, Surrey, England
 Beacon Academy, formerly Beacon Community College, Crowborough, East Sussex, England
 Beacon Academy, Cleethorpes, North East Lincolnshire, England
 The Beacon Academy, Biñan, Philippines
 Beacon College in Leesburg, Florida, U.S.
 Beacon College (Hong Kong)

Places
 Beacon, Western Australia, Australia
 Beacon, Devon, United Kingdom
 Beacon, Iowa, U.S.
 Beacon, Jersey City, New Jersey, U.S.
 Beacon, New York, U.S.
 Beacon station
 Beacon Mountain
 Beacon Valley, Antarctica

Transportation and military
 , a ship, later Empire Guernsey
 , various ships of the Royal Navy
 , various ships of the U.S. Navy

Other uses 
 Beacon (apple), a cultivar of apple
 Beacon Supergroup, a rock formation in Antarctica
 Beacon-class gunvessel, 19th century British ships
 Beacon, an Appro supercomputer 
 'Beacon', a cultivar of barley
 Beacon, an oscillator in Conway's Game of Life
 Bluetooth Low Energy beacon, providing location to devices in its vicinity
 Facebook Beacon, advertising software
 Project Beacon, an early American space satellite program
 Rotating beacon (disambiguation)
 Valparaiso Beacons, the athletic program of Valparaiso University in Indiana
 Web beacon, an Internet web tracking technique

See also

 The Beacon (disambiguation)
 Beacon Fell (disambiguation)
 Beacon Hill (disambiguation)
 Beacon Island (disambiguation)